Spiniductellus atraphaxi is a moth of the family Gelechiidae. It is found in Tajikistan.

The wingspan is 15–16 mm. The forewings are cream-coloured, overlaid with dark brown, especially at the base, as two broad fasciae at one-third and two-thirds and in the apical part. There are two blackish brown patches in the middle of the wing between the two broad fasciae. The costal and tornal spots are cream-yellow, more or less fused. The hindwings are grey. Adults are on wing in mid-July.

The larvae feed on Atraphaxis pyrifolia.

Etymology
The species name refers to the host plant.

References

Moths described in 2008
Anomologini